Iguatu is a city in Ceará, a Brazilian State, with a population of 103,074 (2020 est.). Edinaldo Lavor is the city's mayor.

History 
A village of Quixelôs Indians existed at this site before the arrival of the Portuguese. In 1707 the Society of Jesus began Western settlement here. It has been classed as a city since 1874. It is the seat of the Roman Catholic Diocese of Iguatu.

Transportation 
Iguatu is served by Dr. Francisco Tomé da Frota Airport.

Notable people 
Eleazar de Carvalho - Conductor and composer.
Humberto Teixeira - composer.

References

External links 
Iguatu governmental site (In Portuguese)

Municipalities in Ceará